Gliese 179 b (also known as HIP 22627 b) is an extrasolar planet which orbits the M-type main sequence star Gliese 179, located approximately 40 light years away in the constellation Orion. This planet has a minimum mass a little bit less than Jupiter and it orbits at 2.41 AU or 361 Gm from the star with an eccentricity slightly less than Pluto. The planetary distance ranges from 1.90 to 2.92 AU. This planet was discovered by using radial velocity method from spectrograph taken at Keck Observatory on November 13, 2009.

See also
Other planets that were discovered or confirmed on November 13, 2009:
 HD 34445 b
 HD 126614 Ab
 HD 24496 Ab
 HD 13931 b
 QS Virginis b

Related giant planets around red dwarfs:
 HIP 79431 b
 Gliese 849 b
 Gliese 876 b
 Gliese 876 c
 Gliese 317 b
 Gliese 832 b

References

 

Exoplanets discovered in 2009
Exoplanets detected by radial velocity
Giant planets
Orion (constellation)
1